Route 978, or Highway 978, may refer to:

Israel
 Israel Route 978

United Kingdom
 A978 road

United States